The canyon mouse (Peromyscus crinitus) is a gray-brown mouse found in many states of the western United States and northern Mexico.  Its preferred habitat is arid, rocky desert. Vegetation has little or no effect on the distribution of canyon mice, it is instead associated with rocky substrate than any plant. Canyon mice forage in areas with shrub-like vegetation which can be used for protection against predators. It is the only species in the Peromyscus crinitus species group.

Canyon mice eat seeds, green vegetation, and insects. Small animals and insects make up a larger portion of diet when seeds and vegetation are rare. They breed in the spring and summer.  Females can produce multiple litters of between two and five young every year. Males do not mate with more than one female, and the homes ranges of females and males overlap. Canyon mice are nocturnal and are active through the year.  They usually nest among or below rocks in burrows.

The earliest fossils of canyon mice are from 100,000-130,000 years before present from the Los Angeles Basin.

References

Biotics Database. 2005. Utah Division of Wildlife Resources, NatureServe, and the network of Natural Heritage Programs and Conservation Data Centers.
Burt, W. H. and R. P. Grossenheider. A field guide to the mammals. Houghton Mifflin Company, Boston, 1980.
Musser, G. G. and M. D. Carleton. 2005. Superfamily Muroidea. pp. 894–1531 in Mammal Species of the World a Taxonomic and Geographic Reference. D. E. Wilson and D. M. Reeder eds. Johns Hopkins University Press, Baltimore.
Johnson, D. W., & Armstrong, D. M. (1987). Peromyscus crinitus. Mammalian Species, 287, 1–8.

Mammals of Mexico
Mammals of the United States
Fauna of the Western United States
Peromyscus
Mammals described in 1891
Taxa named by Clinton Hart Merriam